The 2009 Air New Zealand Cup ran from 30 July to 7 November. This page includes all statistics from the 14 teams during the 13 rounds of the round-robin.

There were 3953 points scored with an average of 43.4 points per game; there also were 406 tries scored.

Hawke's Bay scored the most points with 372 and, along with Canterbury and Wellington, the most tries with 40, while Southland had the best defensive record through the competition with only 189 points scored against them through 13 rounds.

Matt Berquist, from Hawke's Bay, scored the most points out of every player in the competition - with 156 points and an average of 14.2 points through his 11 matches. Zac Guildford scored the most tries this season with 13.

Overall

Team
The lists showing all statistics for all teams about points, tries and disciplinary cards.

Points
The table showing how many points scored by each team (white) and how many points each team was scored against them (grey) in the 2009 Air New Zealand Cup Round Robin. Hawke's Bay scored the most points so far with 372 (28.6 points a game), while Southland had the fewest points scored against them with 189 (14.5 points a game).

Tries
The list of how many tries each team scored in the round robin. Canterbury, Wellington and Hawke's Bay scored the most tries this season with 40 each while Taranaki, North Harbour and Northland scored the fewest with 20 each.

Competition Points
List of how many competitions points each team scored with overall and week totals.

Disciplinary cards
List of teams whose players received yellow and/or red cards. Bay of Plenty were issued the most cards with 5 while North Harbour were issued the only red card of the season.

Player
The list of the top players who have scored the most points and tries in the 2009 Air New Zealand Cup. There were 3,953 points including 406 tries scored with a total of 218 players scoring them, Matt Berquist leads them all with 156 points and an average of 14.2 points per game. There have also been 33 yellow cards and 1 red card issued.

Top Ten Points Scorers
A total of 218 players from each team scored points in the round robin, Matt Berquist has scored the most with 156 and average of 14.2 points per game.

Top Try Scorers
A total of 218 players have scored a total of 406 tries. Zac Guildford has scored the most tries by a player this season with 13.

Top Goal Kickers
Mathew Berquist leads all goal kickers this season with 82.2% success rate.

Disciplinary Cards
The list of all players who have received a yellow or red card in the 2009 Air New Zealand Cup. Luke Braid and Colin Bourke, both from Bay of Plenty are the players who received the most disciplinary cards with two yellows each.

Individual Team Statistics
The lists showing each teams; points scorers, try scorers, goal kickers and disciplinary card recipients where available.

Auckland
Auckland scored 272 total points this season including 29 tries. Ash Moeke led them with 75 points scored through 13 games with an average of 5.8 points per game while Joe Rokocoko and Paul Williams led the try scorers with 4 tries each. Flanker Hamish Paterson and Peter Saili were the only players in the Auckland squad to receive a yellow card, which was in round 7 and round 13.

Points

Tries

Goal Kicking

Disciplinary Cards

Bay of Plenty
Bay of Plenty scored a total of 268 points through 13 games with an average of 20.6 points per game. Mike Delany scored the most of these points with 149 and an average of 12.4 points a game. They also scored 24 tries, and were issued five disciplinary cards, also most throughout the competition.

Points

Tries

Goal Kicking

Disciplinary Cards

Canterbury
Canterbury scored 369 points through the round-robin. Daniel Carter scored the most of Canterbury's points, with 98 points and an average of 16.3 points a game. Canterbury also scored 40 tries this season with Sean Maitland scoring the most with 8. Adam Whitelock was  the only player to receive a disciplinary card, with a yellow in round 2 against Auckland.

Points

Tries

Goal Kicking

Disciplinary Cards

Counties Manukau
Counties Manukau scored 235 total points this season with Tim Nanai-Williams leading them with 70 points, they also scored 30 tries, with Ahsee Tuala and Simon Lemalu leading them with 4 each. Winger Sherwin Stowers is the only player to receive a yellow card.

Points

Tries

Goal Kicking

Disciplinary Cards

Hawke's Bay
Hawke's Bay scored 372 points this season, most by any other team. Matt Berquist scored the most points with 156, most among players. They also scored 40 tries including the only penalty try of the season; Zac Guildford led them with 13 tries, also most among players. Sona Taumalolo, Ash Dixon, Matt Egan and Ross Kennedy were the only players in the Hawke's Bay team to receive disciplinary cards with yellows in round 3, round 8, round 9 and round 13.

Points

Tries

Goal Kicking

Disciplinary Cards

Manawatu
Manawatu scored a total of 305 points in the 2009 Air New Zealand Cup. Isaac Thompson led them all with a tally of 71 points and an average of 5.9 a game. Manawatu have  scored 35 tries this season, Andre Taylor led them with 3 tries. Johnny Leota, Brent Thompson and James Goode were the only players to receive disciplinary cards.

Points

Tries

Goal Kicking

Disciplinary Cards

North Harbour
North Harbour scored a total of 244 points this season with an average of 19 points a game, they also scored 20 tries. Michael Harris scored the most points with 108 and an average of 10.8 points a game. North Harbour were issued two disciplinary cards including the only red card of the season, which went to Andrew Mailei in round 9.

Points

Tries

Goal Kicking

Disciplinary Cards

Northland
Northland scored 226 points this season with an average of 17.8 points per game, Lachlan Munro led the team with a tally of 146 points throughout his 13 games. They have also scored 20 tries, which captain Jared Payne led with 6, and had one player receive a disciplinary card, which was also the first in the competition.

Points

Tries

Goal Kicking

Disciplinary Cards

Otago
Otago scored 260 points this season with Glenn Dickson leading them all with 72 points and an average of 5.5 points a game. Ben Smith led the team with 6 tries from a total of 26 from the team. Peter Mirrielees was the only player to receive a disciplinary card with a yellow in round 12.

Points

Tries

Goal Kicking

Disciplinary Cards

Southland
Southland scored 260 points throughout round-robin with an average of 20 points per game. Robbie Robinson scored the most with a tally of 111 points through his 11 games. They also scored 28 tries with locks Josh Bekhuis and Joe Tuineau leading the team with 4 each. Jamie Mackintosh was the only Southland player to receive a yellow card which came in round 7.

Points

Tries

Goal Kicking

Disciplinary Cards

Taranaki
Taranaki scored 252 points this season, with Willie Ripia scoring the most with 115 points through his 11 games. They also scored 20 tries with Tony Penn and Shayne Austin leading them with 3 each. Three Taranaki players received disciplinary cards, all yellow; Scott Waldrom in round 2 against Northland, Jarrad Hoeata in there round 3 draw against Hawke's Bay and Craig Clarke in Round 5 against Manawatu.

Points

Tries

Goal Kicking

Disciplinary Cards

Tasman
Tasman scored a total of 243 points this season. They have also scored 26 tries. Captain Andrew Goodman scored most points scoring 106 points through 13 games while wingers James Kamana and Blair cook led the team with 4 tries each. Kahn Fotuali'i and Alex Ainley were the only players from the team have been given yellow cards.

Points

Tries

Goal Kicking

Disciplinary Cards

Waikato
Waikato scored 285 points this season which Callum Brucescoring the most with 125 points through 13 games with an average of 9.6 points per game. They also scored 28 tries, led by Sosene Anesi with 5. Jordan Smiler, Liam Messam and Save Tokula were the only players to receive a disciplinary card for Waikato; all yellow.

Points

Tries

Goal Kicking

Disciplinary Cards

Wellington
Wellington scored 362 points through the round-robin with an average of 28.3 points per game, and also scored 39 tries. Daniel Kirkpatrick led the team in points with 95 through his 11 games while Hosea Gear led the team in tries with 11. Hosea Gear also, along with Daniel Ramsey and Anthony Perenise, received a disciplinary card, all yellow.

Points

Tries

Goal Kicking

Disciplinary Cards

References

Stats